Red Star is a fictional character from the G.I. Joe: A Real American Hero toyline, comic books and animated series. He is the leader of the Oktober Guard, the Soviet equivalent of the G.I. Joe Team, and successor to Col. Brekhov, the previous leader who died in action.

Biography
Red Star is the code name of Russian Naval Infantry Captain Anatoly Fyodorovich Krimov. He was born in Odessa, Ukraine when the country was still part of the Soviet Union. He was exceptionally bright and became the youngest chess master in Odessa at age seven. He even became a published Pushkin scholar and coach of the pistol team at the Dynamo Sports Club in Moscow.

Toys
Red Star was first released as an action figure in 1991. He was re-released in 2008 in a two-pack with another character, Duke.

Comics
When Red Star is introduced in the G.I. Joe comics series (the Marvel Comics run), he resembled his predecessor, Col. Brekhov, down to the appreciation for cigars. Red Star appears years after Brekhov died in the comics.

He travels into space with other Guard members in #145-149; they assist the Joe team in destroying an asteroid threatening Earth.

Animated series

DiC
In the second G.I. Joe animated series produced by DIC Entertainment, Red Star is a part of the Joe Team. He retains the rank of captain and rather than being called Red Star by his Joe teammates, they all addressed him as "Captain Krimov". This may be attributed to the fact that by the time he was introduced, the Soviet Union has dissolved. He was usually portrayed as somewhat of a comic relief and more interested in American pop culture. He also commanded the G.I. Joe General vehicle in episode 15 General Confusion.

He appeared in the following episodes, voiced by Brent Chapman:
 Episode 13 Cold Shoulder (Cpt. Krimov)
 Episode 15 General Confusion (Cpt. Krimov)/Big Ben)
 Episode 16 Night of the Creepers (Cpt. Krimov/)
 Episode 17 That's Entertainment (Cpt. Krimov)
 Episode 33 Message from the Deep (Cpt. Krimov) (Didn't speak, only shown)/Big Bear)

Renegades
Red Star first appears in the G.I. Joe: Renegades episode "Union of the Snake." He is depicted as having a scar running from his right cheek to his mouth and a red star on his right hand, also noted for following the studies of Carl von Clausewitz. Red Star is a member of the Oktober Guard who has an axe to grind with the Baroness' family due to what the Cisarovna Family did to his people. He infiltrated the summit at the Cisarovna Chateau disguised as a chef only for the Joes to interfere with an explosion knocking them out enough to be captured. When Snake Eyes and Tunnel Rat rescued the Joes, they take Red Star with them. Red Star wanted to blow up the Cisarovna Family despite the objections of the Joes. Red Star ends up helping the Joes stop their mind-control plot before Red Star results to blow up the Cisarovna Chateau in 9 minutes. Snake Eyes manages to prevent Red Star from blowing up the Cisarovna Chateau while Duke and Scarlett destroy the satellite dish. Red Star then opens a tunnel for the Joes to escape in while he reports to his superiors that the mission was aborted.

References

External links
 Red Star at JMM's G.I. Joe Comics Home Page

G.I. Joe soldiers
Fictional Ukrainian people
Fictional military captains
Fictional Soviet Navy personnel